The Lancashire and Yorkshire Railway Hughes 4-6-4T was a class of steam locomotives.  They were a 4-6-4T tank engine version of the L&YR Class 8 ("Dreadnought" Class 4-6-0), hence they were known as "Dreadnought tanks".

Construction
All were actually built by the London, Midland and Scottish Railway in 1924 after the grouping, albeit at the Lancashire and Yorkshire Railway's Horwich Works.

Numbering
They had been allocated L&Y numbers 1684–1693, but these were never carried and there was no L&YR class number.  The LMS gave them the numbers 11110–11119, and the power classification 5P.

Orders modified or cancelled
Another 20 of this class were ordered but turned out as further examples of the L&YR Class 8.  Orders for an additional 30 were cancelled.  Like the Class 8 on which they were based, they were not particularly successful.

Withdrawal
Withdrawals started in 1938, with three engines (11112, 11115, 11116), one each in 1939 and 1940 (11113 and 11111 respectively), four in 1941 (11114, 11117–11119) and the last (11110) in January 1942. No examples were preserved.

References

Hughes 4-6-4T
5 Hughes 4-6-4T
4-6-4T locomotives
Railway locomotives introduced in 1924
2′C2′ h4t locomotives
Scrapped locomotives
Passenger locomotives